Glassie may refer to:

Glassie (surname)
An alternative name for bar-back